A Divorce of Convenience is a 1921 American silent comedy film directed by Robert Ellis and starring Owen Moore, Katherine Perry and Nita Naldi.

Cast
 Owen Moore as Jim Blake
 Katherine Perry as Helen Wakefield
 George Lessey as Sen. Wakefield
 Nita Naldi as Tula Moliana
 Frank Wunderlee as Blinkwell Jones 
 Dan Duffy as Mr. Hart
 Charles Craig as Mr. Holmes

References

Bibliography
 Munden, Kenneth White. The American Film Institute Catalog of Motion Pictures Produced in the United States, Part 1. University of California Press, 1997.

External links
 

1921 films
1921 comedy films
1920s English-language films
American silent feature films
Silent American comedy films
American black-and-white films
Films directed by Robert Ellis
Selznick Pictures films
1920s American films